Acaena echinata, commonly known as sheep's burr, is a species of perennial herb, in the Rosaceae family, native to Australia.

Description
It grows to a height of 25–40 cm and has shiny, green fern-like leaves 60–150 mm long which are hairy on the underside. Its tiny pale green flowers form a spike and have purple stamens. The burrs it produces are sharply barbed.

Taxonomy
The Latin specific epithet of echinata refers to hedgehog, from echinus meaning 'prickly'.

References

External links

echinata
Flora of New South Wales
Flora of Queensland
Flora of Victoria (Australia)
Rosids of Western Australia
Flora of Tasmania
Plants described in 1844